Brandon Ghee (born June 6, 1987) is a former American football cornerback. He was drafted by the Bengals in the third round (96th overall) of the 2010 NFL Draft and has also played for the Tennessee Titans. He played college football at Wake Forest.

High school career
Ghee attended Jack Britt High School in Fayetteville, North Carolina, where he was named all-state as a cornerback and all-region as a wide receiver. He also helped Jack Britt to the state championship game and scored two touchdowns in that contest.

Considered a three-star recruit by Rivals.com, Ghee was listed as the No. 28 cornerback prospect in the nation in 2005. He chose Wake Forest over offers from Clemson, North Carolina, Tennessee and Virginia Tech.

College career
Ghee redshirted his initial season at Wake Forest, and did not participate in any team activities the following season because of academic reasons.

In 2007, he started each of the final 10 games and ranked fourth on the squad with 56 tackles. He also had 10 pass breakups, the second-most on the team.

As a redshirt junior in 2008, Ghee played in 11 games and finished second in the ACC in fumbles forced with four.

Professional career

Cincinnati Bengals
Ghee was selected by the Cincinnati Bengals in the 3rd round of the 2010 NFL Draft. He was placed on injured reserve with a wrist injury on August 24, 2012.

San Diego Chargers
He signed a two-year deal with the San Diego Chargers on March 13, 2014.

Tennessee Titans
Ghee signed with the Tennessee Titans on October 8, 2014. He was waived on December 3, 2014.

Second stint with Cincinnati Bengals
Ghee signed with the Cincinnati Bengals on March 19, 2015. He was released by the Bengals on September 5, 2015.

Personal life
His brother, Patrick Ghee, played safety at Wake Forest from 2002 to 2006.

References

External links
San Diego Chargers bio
Wake Forest Demon Deacons bio

1987 births
Living people
American football cornerbacks
Cincinnati Bengals players
Sportspeople from Wiesbaden
Players of American football from North Carolina
San Diego Chargers players
Sportspeople from Fayetteville, North Carolina
Tennessee Titans players
Wake Forest Demon Deacons football players